Cruzeiro do Sul is the name of the Southern Cross (Crux) constellation in Portuguese.

It may refer to any of the following:

Cruzeiro do Sul, Acre, a town in the state of Acre, Brazil
Cruzeiro do Sul, Paraná, a town in the state of Paraná, Brazil
Cruzeiro do Sul, Rio Grande do Sul, a town in the state of Rio Grande do Sul, Brazil
Serviços Aéreos Cruzeiro do Sul, a defunct Brazilian airline, founded in 1927
Order of the Southern Cross, Brazil's highest order of merit
Cruzeiro do Sul is an old Samba school in Novo Hamburgo, Rio Grande do Sul
Cruzeiro do Sul (film), a 1966 film by Fernando Lopes
Cruzeiro do Sul, a 1922 picture by Jorge Colaço, representing a Portuguese ship navigating by the stars in the Southern Cross, exhibited in Pavilhão Carlos Lopes in Lisbon (Lisboa, Portugal.)